Chinchew is a name used in older English books for a port in the Chinese province Fujian, and may refer to:

 Quanzhou, by later authors (the 19th century)
 Zhangzhou, by earlier authors (16-17th century, especially as translation of Spanish/Portuguese "Chincheo").